Rézi Friday is a 1938 Hungarian comedy film directed by Ladislao Vajda and starring Ida Turay, Mici Erdélyi and Antal Páger. The film's sets were designed by art director Márton Vincze. The title refers to the name of its heroine, a resourceful orphan who falls in love with a doctor who works at her school. In 1941 the film was remade in Italy as Teresa Venerdì.

Cast
 Ida Turay as 
 Mici Erdélyi as 
 Antal Páger as Dr. 
 Gábor Rajnay as 
 Mariska Vízváry as 
 Mária Egry as 
 Vilma Medgyaszay as 
 Gyula Gózon as 
 József Juhász as 
 Attila Petheö as 
 Zsuzsa Simon as 
 Erzsi Orsolya as 
 Irén Sitkey as 
 Sándor Peti as 
 Hilda Gobbi as 
 Adrien Hollán 
 Rózsi Tátrai 
 Sári Sugár 
 Kató Szabó 
 Ilona Kiszely 
 Éva Libertiny 
 Valéria Hidvéghy 
 Gyöngyi Váry 
 Irma Lányi 
 Ferenc Pethes as 
 István Lontay 
 Lajos Sugár as 
 Ferenc Galetta

References

Bibliography 
 Reich, Jacqueline & Garofalo, Piero. Re-viewing Fascism: Italian Cinema, 1922-1943. Indiana University Press, 2002.

External links 

1938 films
Hungarian comedy films
1938 comedy films
1930s Hungarian-language films
Films directed by Ladislao Vajda
Hungarian black-and-white films